HMS Ursa was a U-class destroyer of the Royal Navy that saw service during the Second World War. She was later converted into a Type 15 fast anti-submarine frigate, with the new pennant number F200.

Design
Ursa was one of eight U-class destroyers ordered as the 7th Emergency Flotilla on 12 June 1941. The U-class were War Emergency Programme destroyers, intended for general duties, including use as anti-submarine escort, and were to be suitable for mass-production. They were based on the hull and machinery of the pre-war J-class destroyers, but with a lighter armament (effectively whatever armament was available) in order to speed production. The U-class were almost identical to the S-class ordered as the 5th Emergency Flotilla and the R-class ordered as the 6th Emergency Flotilla earlier in the year, but were not fitted for operations in Arctic waters.

Displacement was  standard and  full load.

The ship had a main gun armament of four 4.7 inch (120 mm) QF Mk. IX guns, capable of elevating to an angle of 55 degrees, giving a degree of anti-aircraft capability. The close-in anti-aircraft armament for the class was one Hazemayer stabilised twin mount for the Bofors 40 mm gun and four twin Oerlikon 20 mm cannons. This was modified in 1945, with 5 single 40mm Bofors guns added, with one manually-operated Mark III mount in the searchlight position and four power-operated "Boffin" mounts replacing the twin Oerlikon mounts. Two quadruple mounts for 21 inch (533 mm) torpedoes were fitted (these were actually spare quintuple mounts with the centre tube removed), while the ship had an depth charge outfit of four depth charge mortars and two racks, with a total of 70 charges carried.

Ursa was fitted with a Type 291 air warning and Type 276 surface warning radar on the ship's lattice foremast, together with a high-frequency direction finding (HF/DF) aerial. A Type 285 fire control radar integrated with the ship's high-angle gun director, while the Hazemayer mount had an integrated Type 282 radar. The ship had a crew of 179 officers and other ranks.

Ursa was laid down at Thornycroft's Woolston, Southampton shipyard on 2 May 1942 and was launched on 22 July 1943. She was completed on 1 March 1944, and assigned the Pennant number R22.

Type 15 modification
After the end of the Second World War and as the Cold War started, the Royal Navy found itself with a shortage of fast anti-submarine escorts capable of dealing with modern Soviet diesel-electric submarines, with existing sloops and frigates too slow. At the same time, the relatively recent War Emergency destroyers, with their low-angle guns and basic fire control systems, were considered unsuitable for modern warfare, so it was decided to convert these obsolete destroyers into fast escorts, acting as a stop-gap solution until new-build ships, such as the Type 12 frigates could be built in sufficient numbers. The Type 15 frigate was a rebuild of War Emergency destroyers into 'first-rate' anti-submarine ships, with similar anti-submarine equipment as the new frigates. The ships' superstructure and armament was removed, with the ships' forecastle extended rearwards and a new, low but full width superstructure fitted. The revised ships had a much reduced gun armament of one twin 4-inch (102 mm) anti aircraft mount aft of the main superstructure and one twin Bofors mount, but anti-submarine equipment was as fitted to the Type 12s, with Ursa being fitted with two Limbo anti-submarine mortars, directed by Type 170 and 172 sonar.

Service history

Second World War service
Ursa was first allocated to the 25th Destroyer Flotilla, serving with the Home Fleet. On 30 March 1944, Ursa left Scapa Flow as part of the Home Fleet covering force for the Arctic Convoy JW 58 to Russia and the return convoy RA 58.

On 6 June 1944, Ursa, as part of the 25th Destroyer Flotilla, took part in the Normandy landings, supporting the landings on Gold Beach. In an inconclusive encounter, the Allied destroyers outmanoeuvred the German force, with no ships on either side damaged. In early August 1944, operations switched to the French Atlantic coast, with the Home Fleet deploying cruiser and destroyer forces to the Bay of Biscay to prevent attempts of German surface units in the French Atlantic ports to escape back to Germany. The British ships sank Sperrbrecher 157 and forced M385 to run aground and become a total loss, while M275 was badly damaged and T24 more lightly damaged, while Iroquois sustained minor damage. On the night of 22/23 August, Ursa, Mauritius and Iroquois ambushed two groups of German patrol boats (Vorpostenboot) off Audierne, sinking V702, V714, V717, V719, V720, V729 and V730.

Ursa was refitted at Portsmouth in September–October 1944, before leaving for the Far East, rejoining the 25 Destroyer Flotilla at Trincomalee, Ceylon (now Sri Lanka) in November that year. She joined the British Pacific Fleet (BPF) when it was formed on 22 November 1944. On 4 January 1945, Ursa took part in Operation Lentil, a strike by aircraft from the carriers   and  against oil refinerys at Pangkalan Brandan, Sumatra. She served with BPF the until 1945. She then returned to the United Kingdom and paid off in 1946.

During the War Ursa was adopted by the Borough of Hendon as part of Warship Week.  The plaque from this adoption is held by the National Museum of the Royal Navy in Portsmouth.

Post-war service

After the Second World War Ursa went into reserve at Portsmouth, transferring to the Chatham reserve in 1952. During 1953 and 1954 Ursa was converted to a Type 15 anti-submarine frigate with the new pennant number F200. On 29 June 1955 Ursa was re-commissioned at Chatham Dockyard under the Command of Commander Powers, RN. After acceptance trials, and work-up at Portland Naval Base, under Flag Officer Sea training (FOST), she then joined the 6th Frigate Squadron, and left in November 1955, for the Royal Naval Fleet on the Mediterranean Station.

On Boxing Day 1955, the whole Squadron put to sea at short notice into heavy seas, whereupon Ulysses lost several crew members overboard from the forecastle area; the survivors being rescued by a Maltese tug.

Ursa undertook regular anti-gunrunning patrols off Cyprus.  Patrolling the island, in company with other members of the squadron, the object of the patrols was trying to thwart the efforts of EOKA (terrorist groups who were fighting for independence from British rule).  These patrols were generally of six weeks duration, and then a relief.

In June–July 1956 she underwent a minor refit of approximately five weeks in Gibraltar, later going into the King George IV dry dock, with the whole squadron (and two minesweepers) for maintenance.

In November 1956, with the rest of the squadron, Ursa formed part of the Royal Navy's force used during the Suez Operation. This was an Anglo-French-Israeli campaign to recapture the Suez Canal. Towards the end of the brief Suez campaign, she was transferred to providing anti-submarine screening and protection for the tanker force.

She decommissioned in April 1957 at Chatham Dockyard.

In April 1959 Ursa started a refit in Malta Dockyard, but work was stopped after six weeks and Ursa placed in reserve, and did not resume until 1961 at Bailey's Dockyard, Malta, with the ship recommissioning in November that year and joining the 5th Frigate Squadron. She returned to home waters in June, reaching Devonport on 27 June. On the night of 1/2 August 1962, while on anti-submarine exercises in the Firth of Clyde, Scotland, she collided with the destroyer . Ursa suffered a damaged bow, while Battleaxe suffered more consequentially, being struck athwartships, with her hull split down to the keel. While Ursa was repaired, the damage to Battleaxe was considered beyond economic repair, and Battleaxe was therefore decommissioned and scrapped. Two officers and one Chief Petty Officer from Ursas crew were reprimanded in courts-martial resulting from the collision.

In March 1963 Ursa relieved  in the 8th Frigate Squadron, and served as West Indies guard ship from June 1963 until June 1964. She again served in the Bahamas and West Indies in 1966 before paying off at Portsmouth on 28 October that year.

Decommissioning and disposal
Ursa continued in service until paying off at Devonport for the last time on 28 October 1966.  She was subsequently sold for scrapping and arrived at Cashmore's in Newport in 1967.

References

Publications

External links
 Warship Weeks: Adopting Naval Vessels in World War Two | Royal Naval Museum at Portsmouth Historic Dockyard
 Scottish Film Archive footage of the damage to Battleaxe and Ursa following their collision

 

U and V-class destroyers of the Royal Navy
Ships built in Southampton
1943 ships
World War II destroyers of the United Kingdom
Cold War destroyers of the United Kingdom
Type 15 frigates
Cold War frigates of the United Kingdom
Ships built by John I. Thornycroft & Company